Anna Chapin Ray (January 3, 1865 – December 13, 1945) was an American author.

Biography
Born in Westfield, Massachusetts, she was the daughter of Edward Addison Ray
and Helen M. (Chapin). In 1881 she was one of the first three women to take
the Yale University entrance exam.
She studied at Smith College in Northampton, Massachusetts where she received a B.A. in 1885 and an M.A. in modern European history in 1888.

Beginning in 1889,
Anna became a prolific author; her works included many children's books, but she also published adult novels. She wrote during the summer in New Haven, Connecticut, then spent the winter in Quebec. Most of her works were written using the pseudonym Sidney Howard. Her older brother Nathaniel (1858–1917) was a mining engineer and a California state legislator. The two frequently corresponded.

Bibliography

 In Blue Creek cañon (1892)
 Margaret Davis, tutor (1893)
 Dick: a story for boys and girls (1896)
 Half a dozen girls (1897)
 Half a dozen boys: an every-day story (1889)
 How Polly and Ned found Santa Claus (1898)
 Teddy: her book: a story of sweet sixteen (1898)
 Each life unfulfilled (1899)
 Phebe, her profession: a sequel to Teddy: her book (1900)
 The dominant strain (1903)
 Sheba (1903)
 Ursula's freshman (1903)
 Bumper and baby John (1904)
 By the good Sainte Anne: a story of modern Quebec (1904)
 On the firing line" a romance of South Africa (1905) with Hamilton Brock Fuller
 Hearts and creeds (1906)
 Janet : her winter in Quebec (1906)
 Ackroyd of the faculty (1907)
 Teddy, her daughter; a sequel to Teddy, her book (1907)
 Quickened (1908)
 The bridge builders (1909)
 Janet at odds (1909)
 Nathalie's chum (1909)
 Nathalie's sister: the last of the McAlister records (1909)
 Sidney at college (1909)
 Over the quicksands (1910)
 A woman with a purpose (1911)
 The Brentons (1912)
 Sidney: her summer on the St. Lawrence (1912)
 On board the Beatic (1913)
 The responsibilities of Buddie (1913)
 Letters of a Canadian stretcher bearer (1918) editor

Notes

References

External links
 
 
 
 

1865 births
1945 deaths
Smith College alumni
Writers from Massachusetts
Writers from New Haven, Connecticut
People from Westfield, Massachusetts